The 1961 San Francisco 49ers season was the franchise's 12th season in the National Football League and their 16th overall.  The 49ers won seven games and lost six, with one game ending in a tie.  As a result, the team finished in fifth-place in the NFL Western Conference. The 49ers had three first-round picks in the NFL Draft.

Offseason

NFL Draft

Regular season

Schedule

Standings

Roster

Awards and records

Milestones

References

 1961 49ers on Pro Football Reference
 49ers Schedule on jt-sw.com

San Francisco 49ers
San Francisco 49ers seasons
San Fran
San Fran 49